John Locke (1805 – 28 January 1880) was an English barrister, author and Liberal Party politician.

The only son of John Locke, a surveyor of Herne Hill, he was educated at Dulwich College. Reading law at Trinity College, Cambridge, he left with an MA in 1832 and was called to the Bar from the Inner Temple in 1833.

Between 1845 and 1857 he was a common pleader of the City of London, and counsel to the Inland Revenue.
He was elected as the Member of Parliament (MP) for Southwark at the general election in April 1857, and held the seat until his death. He was mainly active in causes for the working class and local government, introducing a bill that give witnesses in criminal cases the right to affirm as in civil cases.

He died in February 1880 and was buried in the catacombs at West Norwood Cemetery.

Notes and references

Sources 
 Locke, John (1805–1880), J. A. Hamilton, rev. H. C. G. Matthew, Oxford Dictionary of National Biography

External links 
 

1805 births
1880 deaths
Burials at West Norwood Cemetery
Liberal Party (UK) MPs for English constituencies
UK MPs 1857–1859
UK MPs 1859–1865
UK MPs 1865–1868
UK MPs 1868–1874
UK MPs 1874–1880
People educated at Dulwich College
Alumni of Trinity College, Cambridge
Members of the Inner Temple